Waikanae is a town on the Kapiti Coast, 60 kilometres north of the Wellington CBD. The name is a Māori word meaning "waters" (wai) "of the grey mullet".

The town lies between Paraparaumu, eight kilometres to the southwest, and Ōtaki, 15 kilometres to the northeast. It contains Waikanae railway station, the northernmost station to which the Metlink trains from Wellington railway station in Central Wellington go.

(There is another beach named "Waikanae Beach" in the town of Gisborne, on the other side of the North Island.)

Geography

Waikanae lies in a setting of open farmland and forest between the Tasman Sea and the rugged Tararua Range. Together with its neighbouring settlement of Waikanae Beach, the town comprises a quiet locale, popular with families and retirees. Just north of Waikanae is the small community of Peka Peka.

The Kapiti Island Nature Reserve includes the Waikanae Estuary Scientific Reserve. Te Araroa (the country's long-distance walking trail) leads through Waikanae.

The waters between Waikanae Beach and Kapiti Island comprise the Kapiti Marine Reserve, with whales and Hector's dolphins sometimes spotted on their migration routes through the narrow corridor. Inland, behind Waikanae, are the bush clad Hemi Matenga Reserve, the Tararua Ranges and the Akatarawa Valley, home to a conservation park, Staglands Wildlife Reserve & Cafe.  A road through the valley over the Akatarawa Saddle provides a link with the Hutt Valley via Reikorangi and Cloustonville. The headwaters of the Waikanae River form where a number of streams converge in the inland Reikorangi Basin. From here the river runs through a gap in the foothills, across the coastal plain and sand dunes to the sea.

Prior to human settlement the Waikanae coastal plain comprised wetlands divided by a complex pattern of natural waterways and kohekohe wooded regions. Wetlands remain a diminishing feature of the region but the development of numerous private gardens has led to Waikanae having one of the highest levels of water consumption per head of population in New Zealand. The community draws its water from the single source of the Waikanae River, and seasonal shortages during the warmer months of the year constitute a growing problem for the area.

Climate
The Tararua Range provides shelter for Waikanae from the south and east, as does Kapiti Island from the west. The area accordingly escapes the heavy winds and storms of the neighboring Cook Strait region. The shallow depths of Waikanae Beach produces a higher water temperature than the steeper coastlines of Wellington harbour to the south. The prevailing wind blows from the north-west, which drives rain-clouds inland to the ranges and results in high rainfalls during the winter and spring.

Birdlife

Waikanae Beach is populated by terns, seagulls, oystercatchers, and stilts. Inland wetlands provide refuge for pūkeko, crake and New Zealand dabchicks. White fronted herons, tui and shags range across the coastal plain. The ready availability of both birdlife and seafood encouraged early Māori settlement of the area. Introduced species such as ducks and black swans have also flourished over the last century.

Hemi Matenga Memorial Scenic Reserve

Waikanae is backed by the heavily forested 330-hectare Hemi Matenga Reserve covering a range overlooking the town itself. Rising to 514 metres above sea level, the forest comprises one of the most extensive areas of kohekohe woodland left in New Zealand. The reserve was named after its former owner; Hemi Matenga Waipunahau of the Ngati Toa, following his death in 1912. It is traversed by several walking tracks and forms an extension of the Tararua Range.

History and culture

Archaeological and ethnographical research suggests that Waikanae may have been first inhabited by the Waitaha moa-hunters as early as a thousand years ago. Successive waves of settlement by the Ngati Apa, Rangitane and Muaupoko Iwi (tribal groups) ensured that the area continues to have major historic and mythological significance for the Māori people of New Zealand. See Kapiti Coast for greater detail.

In 1824 Waikanae Beach was the embarkation point for a force of 2,000 to 3,000 fighters from coastal Iwi, who assembled with the intention of taking Kapiti Island from the Ngāti Toa led by Te Rauparaha. Crossing the strait in a fleet of waka canoes under shelter of darkness, the attackers were met and destroyed as they disembarked at the northern end of Kapiti Island.

Marae

Whakarongotai Marae is located in Waikanae. It is a marae (social and cultural meeting ground) for Te Atiawa ki Whakarongotai and includes the Whakarongotai or Puku Mahi Tamariki wharenui (meeting house).

Demographics

Waikanae had a population of 12,711 at the 2018 New Zealand census, an increase of 1,605 people (14.5%) since the 2013 census, and an increase of 2,148 people (20.3%) since the 2006 census. There were 5,460 households. There were 5,853 males and 6,858 females, giving a sex ratio of 0.85 males per female, with 1,881 people (14.8%) aged under 15 years, 1,344 (10.6%) aged 15 to 29, 4,845 (38.1%) aged 30 to 64, and 4,632 (36.4%) aged 65 or older.

Ethnicities were 90.9% European/Pākehā, 9.2% Māori, 2.1% Pacific peoples, 4.5% Asian, and 2.0% other ethnicities (totals add to more than 100% since people could identify with multiple ethnicities).

The proportion of people born overseas was 24.9%, compared with 27.1% nationally.

Although some people objected to giving their religion, 48.8% had no religion, 41.3% were Christian, 0.4% were Hindu, 0.2% were Muslim, 0.5% were Buddhist and 2.1% had other religions.

Of those at least 15 years old, 2,766 (25.5%) people had a bachelor or higher degree, and 1,635 (15.1%) people had no formal qualifications. The employment status of those at least 15 was that 4,011 (37.0%) people were employed full-time, 1,482 (13.7%) were part-time, and 279 (2.6%) were unemployed.

It is forecast that Waikanae's relative abundance of unoccupied land and recent or pending improvements in transport links will lead to a population increase to about 15,000 by 2032.

Facilities

The central Waikanae Village includes two supermarkets, the Mahara Art Gallery, three bank branches, a health centre, three pharmacies, craft and art shops, a post shop, a war memorial hall, a smaller community hall, the Kapiti Coast Museum, a church, a public library, a cinema and a number of other shops, restaurants, and businesses. Nearby are the Ngā Manu Nature Reserve, two primary schools (see below), a golf course, bowling club, Waikanae Park rugby and cricket ground, and several retirement centres.

Mahara Gallery is an art gallery opened in 1996.

Housing

Waikanae is the largest of the 14 residential suburbs which lie within the Territorial Authority of the Kapiti Coast, in terms of the total number of residential properties. The greater portion of Waikanae's houses were constructed during the period 1970–1979.

Transport
 The town is located on State Highway 1 and the North Island Main Trunk railway. In February 2017 an expressway diversion was opened to enable State Highway 1 to bypass the centre of the township.

The town is the current northern terminus of the Kapiti Line for the Metlink commuter rail service. This service has operated since February 2011, into the newly rebuilt Waikanae Railway Station. The new Matangi electric multiple units entered service at the same time in 2011. Prior to that, the only direct commuter train to Wellington was the Capital Connection from Palmerston North which still leaves for Wellington in the morning and returns in the evening en route to Palmerston North.

Local bus services link Waikanae Village with Waikanae Beach and Otaki.

Local media

A radio station Beach FM 106.3 broadcasts from Waikanae Village, covering the Kapiti and Horowhenua districts. Two local newspapers provide coverage of the Kapiti region.

Education

Notable people
Erunui Matioro Te Tupe-o-Tu: retired to Waikanae after a colourful life as a tribal leader, warrior, whaler, slaver, and sealer; during the early colonial period from the 1820s to the 1850s.
Jim Bolger, former New Zealand Prime Minister, currently lives in Waikanae.

See also
 Waikanae River
 Waianae, Hawaii

References

External links

 Waikanae Village website
 Regional website
 Paragraph on Waikanae c1897 from the Cyclopaedia of New Zealand
 Photo of Waikanae c1897 from the Cyclopaedia of New Zealand
 Photo of Maori Meeting House Waikanae c1897 from the Cyclopaedia of New Zealand
 Kapiti Visitor Information Centre

 
Populated places in the Wellington Region
Kapiti Coast District